Simon Scott (September 21, 1920 – December 11, 1991) was an American character actor from Monterey Park, California. He was best known for his role as Arnold Slocum on Trapper John M.D. and as General Bronson on McHale's Navy.

Career

Scott became a company member at Peninsula Players Theatre in Fish Creek in 1950, Wisconsin using the name Dan Scott prior to his Hollywood success.  He performed in many stage productions with the theater, including the 1948 production of The Second Man, the 1950 production of You Can't Take it With You and the 1963 production of The Night of the Iguana.

Scott starred in the early episodes of Markham as John Riggs, the title character's sidekick. However the character of Riggs was dropped after only eight episodes.
Scott made five guest appearances on Perry Mason, including the role of murderer Stanley Overton in one of the series' final episodes in 1966 titled "The Case of the Positive Negative". He also appeared on dozens of other TV series, making numerous appearances each on series including 77 Sunset Strip, Bonanza, The F.B.I., 1973 Cannon, The Invaders, and Ironside. Scott also played in Barnaby Jones, in an episode titled “Trap Play”(01/07/1975).

Scott also had a recurring role as Chief Metcalf on the ABC series The Mod Squad. In addition he also guest starred on series including The Munsters, The Fugitive, Mannix and most notably the 1960 The Twilight Zone episode "The Last Flight".

Death
Scott died on December 11, 1991, in Los Alamitos, California of complications of Alzheimer's disease. The disease had forced him into retirement six years earlier.

Filmography

1954: The Raid as Capt. Floyd Henderson (uncredited)
1954: Black Tuesday as Parker (uncredited)
1956: I've Lived Before as Robert Allen, Attorney
1956: Accused of Murder as Jeff - Daytime Desk Cop (uncredited)
1957: Battle Hymn as Lt. Hollis
1957: Man of a Thousand Faces as Carl Hastings
1959: No Name on the Bullet as Reeger
1959: Compulsion as Detective Brown (uncredited)
1961: The Honeymoon Machine as Capt. Harvey Adam
1962: Moon Pilot as Medical Officer
1962: The Couch as Lt. Kritzman
1963: The Ugly American as Johnson
1964: Shock Treatment as Police Desk Sergeant (uncredited)
1964: Ready for the People (TV Movie) as District Attorney
1964: Father Goose as Captain of Submarine, USS Sailfin (uncredited)
1965: Strange Bedfellows as Jim Slade, Divorce Lawyer (uncredited)
1965: The Loved One as Priest at Meeting (uncredited)
1966: Dead Heat on a Merry-Go-Round as William Anderson
1968: In Enemy Country as General Jomar
1969: Anatomy of a crime (TV Movie) as George Harrington
1970: The Cliff (TV Movie)
1971: Cold Turkey as Mr. Kandiss
1972: Welcome Home, Johnny Bristol (TV Movie) as Col. Anderson
1972: The Man as Hugh Gaynor
1972: The Marshall of Madrid (series special of Cade's County)
1973: Six Million Dollar Man, The: Wine, Women and War as Captain Dawson
1974: The Disappearance of Flight 412 (TV Movie) as Col. Freeman Barns
1975: The Hindenburg as Luftwaffe General
1977: Tail Gunner Joe (TV Movie) as Robert Ten Broeck Stevens
1977: Twilight's Last Gleaming as Gen. Phil Spencer
1979: The Return of Mod Squad (TV Movie) as Metcalf

Television

1952: Biff Baker, U.S.A. as Perkins
1955: Gunsmoke as Mr. Rogers
1958: Perry Mason 1x39 The Case of the Rolling Bones as George Metcalf, 3x06 The Case of Paul Drake's Dilemma as Charles Dameron, 5x22 The Case of the Crippled Cougar as Elliot Dunbar, 8x03 The Case of the Scandalous Sculptor as Rex Ainsley, 9x28 The Case of the Positive Negative as Stanley Overton
1959: Markham as John Riggs
1959–1968: Bonanza 1x13 Vendetta as Tom Pryor, 3x20 Lost Yesterday as Trev Holcomb, 5x09 Dead-Eye Dick as District Attorney, 7x14 All Ye His Saints as Evan Thorpe (1965), 9x22 The Late Ben Cartwright as Judge John Farraday (1968)
1959: The Twilight Zone
1962: Alcoa Premiere 2x12 The Potentate as Raknitch
1962: Surfside 6 2x31 Green Bay Riddle as Chris Nordheim
1962: Saints and Sinners 1x07 A Servant in the House of My Party as Bill Wexler
1962: GE True 1x10 Cheating Cheaters as Captain
1962: Going My Way 1x08 A Matter of Principle as Larry Raymond
1961–1963: 77 Sunset Strip 4x13 The Navy Caper as Capt. Bill Ivers, 4x21 Brass Ring Caper as Brad Kalem, 5x01 The Reluctant Spy as Hank Rush, 5x15 Scream Softly, Dear Was arren Collins
1963: General Hospital as Fred Fleming
1963: Hawaiian Eye 4x13 Kupikio Kid as Judson Kirk
1963–1964: The Alfred Hitchcock Hour 1x17 Forecast: Low Clouds and Coastal Fog as Stan Wilson, 2x09 The Dividing Wall as Durrell, 3x10 Memo from Purgatory as The Defender
1963–1964: Temple Houston 1x11 Seventy Times Seven as Sheriff Hab Martin, 1x26 Miss Katherine as Henry Rivers
1963–1964: Bob Hope Presents the Chrysler Theatre 1x08 The Candidate as Dr. Bross, 1x21 A Slow Fade to Black as Henderson
1963–1966: The Virginian 2x05 The Evil That Men Do as Warden Fred Harris
1964: The Rogues 1x10 Fringe Benefits as Gus Becker
1964: Mr. Novak 2x05 One Monday Afternoon as Ralph Donan
1965: I Spy 1x12 Three Hours on a Sunday Night as Mr. Starrett
1965: Voyage to the Bottom of the Sea 1x23 The Human Computer as Reston
1965: A Man Called Shenandoah 1x08 Town on Fire as Tom Wade
1965: Death Valley Days 14x07 No Place for a Lady as Samuel Magoffin
1965: Convoy 1x02 Flight from Norway as Gen. Walther Korsch
1965–1966: McHale's Navy 4x07 The Bald-Headed Contessa, 4x08 Voltafiore Fish-Fry, 4x11 The McHale Opera Company, 4x13 Blitzkrieg at McHale's Beach, 4x16 The Boy Scouts of 73, 4x17 Fire in the Liquor Locker, 4x21 McHale's Country Club Caper, 4x22 Secret Chimp 007, 4x27 The McHale Grand Prix, all as Gen. Bronson
1966: T.H.E. Cat 1x10 To Bell T.H.E. Cat as Senator
1966: The Munsters 2x31 Herman's Lawsuit as Wilbur Kingsley
1966: Pistols 'n' Petticoats 1x09 Cards Anyone as Sloan
1966: The Fugitive 4x05 Ten Thousand Pieces of Silver as Martin Pierce
1966–1968: The Wild Wild West 1x24 The Night of the Druid's Blood as Col. Fairchild, 2x02 The Night of the Golden Cobra as Col. Stanton Mayo, 4x03 The Night of the Juggernaut as Theodore Bock
1966–1969: The F.B.I. 1x24 The Man Who Went Mad by Mistake as John Goddard, 2x19 The Gray Passenger as Colfax, 3x01 The Gold Card as Aaron Kellin, 3x16 Crisis Ground as Talbot, 4x02 Out of Control as Douglas Benson, 5x06 Gamble with Death as Alexander York
1967: Iron Horse 2x09 Four Guns to Scalplock as Glenn Falconer
1967: Ironside 1x04 Dead Man's Tale as Warren Stuart,  1x15 Girl in the night as Jim Cardoff, 2x01 Shell Game as Waltham, 3x13 Beyond a shadow as John Lovell, 4x10 The man on the inside as Carmine De Bello
1967–1968: The Invaders 1x12 Storm as Dr. Ed Gantley / Prof. Malcolm Gantley, 2x01 Condition: Red as Maj. Pete Stanhope, 2x19 The Pit as Dr. John Slaton
1968: The Outsider 1x13 There Was a Little Girl as George Harrington
1968: Mannix 2x01 The Silent Cry as Roger L. Wade
1968: The Name of the Game 1x07 Shine On, Shine On, Jesse Gil as Harvey Hampton 
1968–1969: Judd, for the Defense 1x26 You Remember Joe Maddox as George Keefer, 2x22 The View from the Ivy Tower as Max Chancery
1968–1973: The Mod Squad 1x01 The Teeth of the Barracuda, 1x08 The Price of Terror, 1x19 The Uptight Town, 5x08 Corbey as Chief Barney Metcalf
1969 Medical Center 1x03 Emergency in Ward E as Carl Marriott
1970: Insight The 7 Minute Life of James Houseworthy as Clyde, Why Don't You Call Me Skipper Anymore? as William Lunt
1970: The Interns 1x05 Eyes of the Beholder as Jim
1970: Matt Lincoln 1x02 Charles
1971: Cade's County 1x04 Crisscross as Owen Rauth
1971: Days of Rage 1x24 Days of Rage as Walter Hendricks
1972: Longstreet 1x23 The Sound of Money Talking as Henry Benton
1972: The Sixth Sense 1x05 The Man Who Died at Three and Nine as Stuart Forbes
1972–1976: Cannon 2x12 The Endangered Species as Bill Coates (1972), 2x23 Press Pass To The Slammer, 3x12 Trial By Terror, 4x08 A Killing In The Family, 5x21 The Quasar Kill as Dr. Lawrence (1976), 5x25 Madman as General Stevenson
1972–1976: The Rookies 1x07 The Bear That Didn't Get Up as Mr. Palmer
1973: Search 1x21 Ends of the Earth as Timothy Slater
1973: Escape 1x1 The Sub as Adm. Lockery
1973: McCloud 4x02 The Solid Gold Swingers as Arthur Ferris 
1973: The Wide World of Mystery 1.12 Night Train to Terror as McGuffin
1974: Owen Marshall: Counselor at Law I've Promised You a Father as Frank Bayliss
1974: The Magician 1x19 The Illusion of the Lethal Playthings as Jackson Wyndham 
1974: The Six Million Dollar Man 2 episodes as Dr. Barto / Dr. Samuel Abbott
1974: Petrocelli 1x09 An Act of Love as Sam James, 1x17 A Lonely Victim as Ryder Carson
1975: The Manhunter 1x20 The Death Watch
1975: The Streets of San Francisco 2x09 The Twenty-Four Karat Plague as Professor William Mason 
1975: Barnaby Jones 3x14 Trap Play as Paul
1975: Barbary Coast as Senator Manning / Brant Hollister
1975: Caribe 1x13 Assault on the Calavera as Gabriel Hopkins
1976: Once an Eagle in 4 episodes
1976: The Rockford Files 3x10 Piece Work as Gregory McGill
1977: The New Adventures of Wonder Woman as Sam Tucker
1977: Kingston: Confidential as Duane Maxwell
1977: The Hardy Boys/Nancy Drew Mysteries 1x01 The Mystery of the Haunted House as Man
1978: The Amazing Spider-Man The Deadly Dust: Part 1 as Dr. Baylor 
1979–1985: Trapper John, M.D. as Arnold Slocum (final television appearance)
1980: Charlie's Angels 4x25/26 One Love... Two Angels: Part I+II as Richard Carver
1980: Galactica 1980 1x04 The Super Scouts, Part I as Captain

References

5. Demetria Fulton; previewed Simon Scott on Barnaby Jones, in the episode titled “Trap Play”(01/07/1975).

External links

1920 births
1991 deaths
20th-century American male actors
American male film actors
American male television actors
Male actors from California
Deaths from dementia in California
Deaths from Alzheimer's disease